The 32nd Sports Emmy Awards were presented on May 2, 2011 at the Frederick P. Rose Hall at the Jazz at Lincoln Center in New York City.

Awards

Programs

Personalities

Technical

References
NBC, HBO lead Sports Emmy wins - Variety
The National Academy of Television Arts and Sciences Announces Winners of 32nd Annual Sports Emmy Awards

 032
Sports Emmy Awards
Emmy Awards